K-284 may refer to:
Russian submarine K-284 Akula
K-284 (Kansas highway)
K. 284, Wolfgang Amadeus Mozart's Piano Sonata No. 6 in D major